Aminoacylase-1 is an enzyme that in humans is encoded by the ACY1 gene.

Function 

Aminoacylase-1 is a cytosolic, homodimeric, zinc-binding enzyme that catalyzes the hydrolysis of acylated L-amino acids to L-amino acids and acyl group, and has been postulated to function in the catabolism and salvage of acylated amino acids.  ACY1 has been assigned to chromosome 3p21.1, a region reduced to homozygosity in small-cell lung cancer (SCLC), and its expression has been reported to be reduced or undetectable in SCLC cell lines and tumors. The amino acid sequence of human aminoacylase-1 is highly homologous to the porcine counterpart, and ACY1 is the first member of a new family of zinc-binding enzymes.

References

External links

Further reading 

 
 
 
 
 
 
 
 

Human proteins